This is a timeline of Nigerian history, comprising important legal and territorial changes and political events in Nigeria and tis predecessor states.  To read about the background to these events, see History of Nigeria.  See also the list of heads of state of Nigeria.

 Centuries: 17th18th19th20th21st

Early history 

 8000 B.C. – Creation of oldest currently known artifacts and stone shelters. Igboland mostly occupied by foragers, including Bantu ancestors.
 3000–500 B.C. – Development of agriculture (probably including yam cultivation) and animal husbandry. 
 500 B.C. – A.D. 200 – Nok culture flourishes in Northern Nigeria. 
 400–100 B.C. – Ironworking develops around Opi, Nsukka
 500 A.D. - End of the Nok culture

Rise of Igbo, Yoruba, Edo, and Muslim civilizations 

 700 A.D – Early Ijaw settlement.
 800 A.D – Mega-state at IgboUkwu has complex social structure, produces copious artifacts including bronzes.  Yoruba civilization already well established, based on thirteen farming villages centered at Ilé-Ifẹ̀.
 900 – The reign of the Kingdom of Nri began.
 1100 – The Islamic state of Borno was established.
 1200 – Ilé-Ifẹ̀ becomes Yoruba metropolis.
 1255 – Oba Ewedo comes to power in Benin Empire.
 1450 – Beginning of European contact on the Atlantic coast.
 1500 – The nominally Muslim Hausa Kingdoms were established in Northern Nigeria.

17th century

18th CENTURY

19th century

20th century

21st century

2011 upward

See also
 List of years in Nigeria
 Timelines of cities in Nigeria: Ibadan, Kano, Lagos, Port Harcourt

References

Bibliography 
REUTERS - Nigeria Chronology
 Ejiogu, EC. "Chinua Achebe on Biafra: An Elaborate Deconstruction". Journal of Asian and African Studies 48.6, 2013.
 Falola, Toyin, & Matthew M. Heaton. A History of Nigeria. Cambridge University Press, 2008. 
Muslim Civic Cultures and Conflict Resolution: The Challenge of Democratic Federalism in Nigeria — John N. Paden
 Oriji, John N. Political Organization in Nigeria Since the Late Stone Age: A History of the Igbo People. New York: Palgrave Macmillan (St. Martin's Press), 2011.

Further reading
 
 
 
  
 
 
 
 
 Toyin Falola; Ann Genova (2009). "Chronology". Historical Dictionary of Nigeria. Scarecrow Press. .
 
 
 

History of Nigeria
Nigerian timelines